Winterborne Kingston is a village and civil parish in the county of Dorset in southern England. It is situated in a winterbourne valley on the edge of the dip slope of the Dorset Downs. In the 2011 census the parish had 282 households and a population of 643. In 2001 it had a population of 613.

Description
Winterborne Kingston consists of Kingston, which is two thirds of the western area of the parish, and Turberville (later called Abbots Court Farm) to the east. Still further east is the hamlet of Winterborne Muston. The River Winterborne which flows through the village is a tributary of the River Stour. As the name implies, the river tends to flow only in winter. Kingston means the King held land here and bourne is an old Dorset word meaning River, thus the name of the village can be translated as Kings Land by the Winter River. Amenities in the village include  the Greyhound Inn, the Church of St Nicholas, The Dunbury Academy School, the village hall and a recreational ground (including a children's playpark).

History
Icknield Street, a prehistoric route later used by the Romans, passes through the village, and Roman artefacts have been revealed here in ploughed fields.

Dorset historically had many cottage industries related to the clothing trade. Button making (buttony) developed in the 1680s in the villages with Blandford the main centre. The 1851 census shows that many of the women in Winterborne Kingston were button makers. Most of the men in this area worked as agricultural labourers. The farms in this area were small dairy farms, which supplied dairy products to the London markets. There were also limekilns, which were an important part of the agricultural scene as they produced lime for spreading on the land. Barley was one of the main crops, and was used in the production of malt for the brewing of beer in Dorsetshire and London Breweries. Other trades in the area were carpenters, bricklayers, blacksmiths and shoemakers.

Parish church
The village church is named after St Nicholas. It is in the Decorated style and faced with flint. The Victorian architect George Edmund Street remodelled the church in 1872.

Notable residents
The chemist and botanist Humphry Bowen (1929–2001), author of The Flora of Dorset (2000), lived near the village during his retirement when he wrote the Flora.

Duropolis

In July 2015, archeologists discovered the Iron Age remains of what is believed to be Britain's oldest planned town near Winterborne Kingston.

References

External links

Villages in Dorset